Proto-Tocharian, also spelled Proto-Tokharian ( or ), is the reconstructed proto-language of the extinct Tocharian branch of the Indo-European languages.

Proto-Tocharian is the unattested reconstructed ancestor of an Indo-European eponymous extinct branch, known from manuscripts dating from the 5th to the 8th century AD, which were on the northern edge of the Tarim Basin and the Lop Desert. The discovery of this language family in the early 20th century contradicted the formerly prevalent idea of an east–west division of the Indo-European language family on the centum–satem isogloss, and prompted reinvigorated study of the family.

The documents record two closely related languages, called Tocharian A (also East Tocharian, Agnean or Turfanian) and Tocharian B (West Tocharian or Kuchean). The subject matter of the texts suggests that Tocharian A was more archaic and used as a Buddhist liturgical language, while Tocharian B was more actively spoken in the entire area from Turfan in the east to Tumshuq in the west. A body of loanwords and names found in Prakrit documents from the Lop Nor basin have been dubbed Tocharian C (Kroränian). A claimed find of ten Tocharian C texts written in Kharoṣṭhī script has been discredited.

Tocharian A and Tocharian B, the two major languages descendant of Proto-Tocharian, are mutually unintelligible, which led linguists to think that the split of Proto-Tocharian in several branches was several millennia ago. As part of the same language family, the Tocharian languages and their common ancestor are studied together by scholars.

Evolution

Vowels
Proto-Tocharian shows radical changes in its vowels from Proto-Indo-European (PIE). Length distinctions eventually disappeared, but prior to that all pairs of long and short vowels had become distinct in quality, and thus have different outcomes. Many pairs of PIE vowels are distinguished in Tocharian only by the occurrence or non-occurrence of palatalization.  For example, PIE o and ē both evolved into Proto-Tocharian ë (possibly ), but PIE ē palatalized the preceding consonant, and left a y when no consonant preceded, while neither of these occurs with PIE o.

Reconstructing the changes between PIE and Proto-Tocharian vowels is fraught with difficulty, and as a result there are a large number of disagreements among different researchers.  The basic problems are:
Tocharian A and B are relatively sparsely attested.
The extensive mergers of PIE stop consonants lead to many ambiguities in the potential etymologies underlying particular Tocharian words.
The radical restructuring of the vowel system means that few potential sound changes can be rejected as unreasonable, no matter how unlikely they may look on the surface.
A large amount of analogical change has occurred in both the nominal and verbal systems, making it difficult to identify which changes are regular.

Historically, the evolution of the Tocharian vowels was the last part of the diachronic phonology to be understood. In 1938, George S. Lane remarked of Tocharian that "the vocalism so far has defied almost every attempt that has been made to bring it to order", and as late as 1945 still asserted: "That the subject [of palatalization] is a confused and difficult one is generally recognized—but so are most of the problems of Tocharian phonology." However, rapid progress towards understanding the evolution of the vocalic system, and with it the phonology as a whole, occurred during the period of approximately 1948–1960, beginning with Sieg and Siegling (1949). By 1960, the system was well-enough understood that Krause and Thomas's seminal work of that year is still considered one of the most important Tocharian grammatical handbooks.

Despite the apparent equivalence between the Tocharian A and B vowel systems, in fact a number of vowels are not cognate between the two varieties, and Proto-Tocharian had a different vowel system from both.  For example, Tocharian A a reflects a merger of two Proto-Tocharian vowels that are distinguished in Tocharian B as e and o, while Tocharian B a reflects a stress-based variant of either Proto-Tocharian ā or ä, while Tocharian A preserves original ā and ä regardless of the position of stress.

As a general rule, Tocharian B reflects the Proto-Tocharian vowel system more faithfully than Tocharian A, which includes a number of changes not found in Tocharian B, e.g. monophthongization of diphthongs, loss of all absolutely final vowels, loss of ä in open syllables, and epenthesis of ä to break up difficult clusters (esp. word-finally) that resulted from vowel losses.

The following table describes a typical minimal reconstruction of Late Proto-Tocharian, which includes all vowels that are generally accepted by Tocharian scholars:

The following table describes a "maximal" reconstruction of Proto-Tocharian, following Ringe (1996):

Some of the differences between the "minimal" and "maximal" systems are primarily notational: Ringe's *ǝ = standard *ä, and Ringe (along with many other researchers) reconstruct Proto-Tocharian surface *[i] and *[u] as underlying *äy, *äw (*ǝy, *ǝw in Ringe's notation).  However, Ringe reconstructs three vowels *ë, *e, *ẹ in place of the single vowel *e in the minimal system.  The primary distinction is between *ë < PIE *o, which is assumed to be a central rather than a front vowel because it does not trigger palatalization, and *e < PIE *ē, which does trigger palatalization.  Other than palatalization effects, both vowels are reflected identically in both Tocharian A and B, and hence a number of researchers project the merger back to Proto-Tocharian.  However, some umlaut processes are thought to have operated differently on the two vowels, and as a result Ringe (as well as Adams and some other scholars) prefer to distinguish the two in Proto-Tocharian.  Ringe's *ẹ vowel, a higher vowel than *e, is fairly rare and appears as i in Tocharian B but e in Tocharian A.  This vowel does trigger palatalization, and is thought by Ringe to stem primarily from PIE *oy and from loanwords.  In general, Ringe's Proto-Tocharian reconstruction reflects an earlier stage than the one described by many researchers.

Some scholars use a different notation from what is given above: e.g. æ or ë in place of the e of the minimal system, å or ɔ in place of the o of the minimal system, and ǝ in place of ä.

The following table shows the changes from Proto-Indo-European (PIE) to Proto-Tocharian (PToch) and on to Tocharian B (TB) and Tocharian A (TA), using the notation of the "minimal" system above:

Notes:
The last six lines indicate umlaut processes that operated during the Proto-Tocharian period (see below).
A + sign indicates palatalization.  When following a consonant, that consonant is palatalized; otherwise, a y appears.  Before PIE i, consonants other than dentals are not necessarily palatalized (researchers differ on what exactly happened); this is indicated as (+).
A – sign indicates no vowel; this results from deletion of ä in open syllables.
Tocharian B reflects Proto-Tocharian central vowels (ä, ā) differently depending on whether they bore stress or not.  This is indicated in the table above: stressed ä ā > a ā while unstressed ä ā > ä a (i.e. Tocharian B a reflects either stressed ä or unstressed ā).  An additional complication is that unstressed ä is deleted in open syllables.  See below.

Proto-Tocharian had phonemic stress, although its position varies depending on the researcher. Many researchers project the Tocharian B stress that is recoverable from ā~a and a~ä alternations back to Proto-Tocharian. For the most part, this stress does not reflect PIE stress.  Rather, most bisyllabic words have initial stress, and trisyllabic and longer words usually have stress on the second syllable.  A number of multisyllabic words in Tocharian B appear to indicate that more than one syllable was stressed; it is thought that these reflect clitics or affixes that still behaved phonologically as separate words in Proto-Tocharian.  Ringe, however, prefers to project the PIE stress unchanged into Proto-Tocharian, and assumes that the radically different system seen in Tocharian B evolved within the separate history of that language.

The outcome of the PIE sequences *iH and *uH when not followed by a vowel is disputed.  It is generally agreed that *ih₂ became Proto-Tocharian *yā; a similar change occurred in Ancient Greek.  It is also usually accepted that *ih₃ likewise became Proto-Tocharian *yā, although it is unclear whether this reflects a direct change *ih₃ > *yā /ya/ or a change *ih₃ > *yō /yo:/ > *yā /ya/ (echoing a similar change in Ancient Greek), since PIE *ō is generally thought to have become Proto-Tocharian *ā (which was not a long vowel).  The outcomes of all other sequences are much less clear.  A number of etymologies appear to indicate a parallel change *uh₂ > *wā, but some also appear to indicate a change *uh₂ > *ū > *u. Ringe demonstrates that all the occurrences of *wā can potentially be explained as due to analogy, and prefers to postulate a general sound change *uH > *ū > *u following the normal outcome of *uH in other languages, but a number of other researchers (e.g. Krause and Slocum) prefer to see *uh₂ > *wā as the regular sound change.  The outcome of *ih₁ is likewise disputed, with Ringe similarly preferring a regular change *ih₁ > *ī > i while others postulate a regular change *ih₁ > *ye > *yä. As elsewhere, the main difficulty is that, relative to other Indo-European languages, Tocharian is sparsely attested and was subject to a particularly large number of analogical changes.

A number of umlaut processes occurred in the Proto-Tocharian period, which tended to increase the number of rounded vowels.  Vowel rounding also resulted from the influence of nearby labiovelars, although this occurred after the Proto-Tocharian period, with differing results in Tocharian A and B, generally with more rounding in Tocharian A (e.g. PIE *gʷṃ- "come" > PToch *kʷäm- > Tocharian A kum- but Tocharian B käm-).

Vowel deletion and insertion
Tocharian A deletes all Proto-Tocharian final vowels, as well as all instances of Proto-Tocharian ä in open syllables (which appears to include vowels followed by Cr and Cl sequences).  When this produces impossible consonant sequences, these are rectified by vocalizing w and y into u and i, if possible; otherwise, an epenthetic ä is inserted.  Note that most consonant sequences are tolerated word-initially, including unexpected cases like rt-, ys- and lks-.  Example: PIE h₁rudhros (Greek erythros) > PToch rä́tre > Toch A *rtr > rtär.

Tocharian B deletes only unstressed ä in open syllables, and leaves all other vowels alone.  Hence PIE h₁rudhros > PToch rä́tre > Toch B ratre.  If necessary, impossible consonant sequences are rectified as in Tocharian A.

Consonants
The following are the main changes between PIE and Proto-Tocharian:
Centum change: PIE "palatals" merge with PIE "plain velars".
Loss of PIE d (but not other dentals) in a number of words when not followed by a PIE front vocalic.
Loss of contrastive voicing and aspiration, resulting in (e.g.) the merger of PIE k, g, gh.
Palatalization of all consonants before PIE e, ē, y and sometimes i, producing a number of new phonemes (c, ś, ṣ, ts, ñ, ly).
Loss of final consonants other than r, including total loss of certain final clusters (e.g. nts).

The extant Tocharian languages appear to reflect essentially the same consonant system as in Proto-Tocharian, except in a couple of cases:
A new phoneme ṅ  eventually developed.  This was originally an allophone of n before k, but became phonemic when vowel losses resulted in instances of nk and ñk contrasting with ṅk, and occasional loss of k between consonants resulted in instances of ṅ not before k.
The Proto-Tocharian labiovelar *kʷ eventually merged with k in both Tocharian A and B.  However, this clearly post-dated Proto-Tocharian, because the former *kʷ often rounded adjacent vowels prior to its loss, in a way that differed between A and B (e.g. Proto-Tocharian *kʷäm- "come" > A kum- but B käm-). In addition, according to Ringe, Proto-Tocharian *kʷ is sometimes retained in Tocharian B when directly preceding a voiceless consonant, particularly in western dialect texts.

Unlike in most centum languages, Proto-Tocharian maintained separate outcomes of PIE *kʷ and *ḱw. The latter is still reflected as kw in Tocharian B, e.g. yakwe "horse" < PIE *eḱwos.

Palatalization
Palatalization was a very important process operating in Proto-Tocharian.  Palatalization appears to have operated very early, prior to almost all of the vowel changes that took place between PIE and Proto-Tocharian. Palatalization occurred before PIE e, ē, y and sometimes i; specifically, PIE i triggered palatalization of dentals but generally not of velars or labials. (According to Ringe, lack of palatalization before PIE i was actually due to early change of i > wǝ after certain sounds.) Palatalization, or lack thereof, is the only way to distinguish PIE e and i in Tocharian, and the primary way of distinguishing certain other pairs of PIE vowels, e.g. e vs. u and ē vs. o. Palatalization appeared to have operated in two stages, an earlier one that affected only the sequences ty and dhy, and a later more general one – or at least, the result of palatalization of t and dh before y is different from palatalization before e, ē and i, while other consonants do not show such a dual outcome. (A similar situation occurred in the history of Proto-Greek and Proto-Romance.) Certain sound changes occurred prior to palatalization:
Some changes involving PIE dentals; see below.
The development of PIE iH into y + vowel. (Note that iH develops to ī in most cases in all other Indo-European languages.)

The following chart shows the outcome of palatalization:

Dental consonants
The outcomes of the PIE dentals in Tocharian, and in particular PIE *d, are complex and difficult to explain.  Palatalization sometimes produces c, sometimes ts, sometimes ś, and in some words when a front vocalic does not follow, PIE *d (but not other dentals) is lost entirely, e.g. e.g. Toch AB or "wood" < PIE *doru and Toch B ime "thought" < PToch *w'äimë < PIE *weid-mo-.  Many occurrences of c and ts can be explained by the differing effects of a following y vs. a front vowel (see above), but a number of difficult cases remain.

Most researchers agree that some of the PIE dentals are reflected differently from others – contrary to the situation with all other PIE stops.  This in turn suggests that some sound changes must have operated on particular dentals, but not others, prior to the general loss of contrastive voicing and aspiration.  There is a large amount of disagreement over what exactly the relevant sound changes were, due to the relatively small number of extant forms involved, the operation of analogy, and disagreement over particular etymologies, including both the PIE roots and ablaut forms involved.  Ringe suggests the following changes, in approximate order:
Grassmann's Law, which triggers the change dh > d when another aspirated consonant occurs later in a word (and which also operated in Greek and Indo-Iranian).
The change d > dz, which occurred after Grassmann's Law if it existed.
Loss of contrastive voicing and aspiration (which may have occurred after palatalization).
Palatalization.  The new sound ts palatalizes to ś; this explains cases like Toch B śak, Toch A śäk "ten" < PIE *dekṃ(t).
Loss of ts before consonants.

Even with this explanation, a lot of words don't have the expected outcomes and require appeal to analogy.  For example, the assumption of Grassmann's Law helps to explain only two words, both verbs, in which PIE *dh shows up as ts; and in both of these words, palatalization to ś might have been expected, because the present-tense forms both begin with PIE *dhe-. Ringe needs to appeal to an analogical depalatalization, based on other forms of the verb with different ablaut patterns in which palatalization was not triggered. This assumption is reasonable, because a lot of other verbs also show analogical depalatalization; but nonetheless, it is rather slender evidence, and it is not surprising that other researchers have proposed different assumptions (e.g. that PToch *tsä- is the expected outcome of PIE *dhe-, with no operation of Grassmann's Law).

Likewise, the loss of PIE *d in Toch AB or "wood" < PIE *doru is not explainable by these rules, because it is lost before a vowel rather than a consonant.  Ringe again assumes analogy: In this case, the PIE conjugation was nominative *doru, genitive *dreus, and Ringe assumes that the normal loss of *d in the genitive before *r was carried over into the nominative. Again, not all researchers accept this. For example, Krause and Slocum, while accepting the remainder of Ringe's sound changes involving PIE *d, suggest instead that loss eventually occurred before Proto-Tocharian rounded vowels and before Proto-Tocharian ë (from PIE o), as well as before nasals and possibly other consonants.

Phonology

Phonetically, Proto-Tocharian is "centum" Indo-European languages, meaning that it merges the palatovelar consonants  of Proto Indo-European with the plain velars (*k, *g, *gʰ) rather than palatalizing them to affricates or sibilants. Centum languages are mostly found in western and southern Europe (Greek, Italic, Celtic, Germanic). In that sense, Proto-Tocharian (to some extent like the Greek and the Anatolian languages) seems to have been an isolate in the "satem" (i.e. palatovelar to sibilant) phonetic regions of Indo-European-speaking populations. The discovery of Tocharian languages contributed to doubts that Proto-Indo-European had originally split into western and eastern branches; today, the centum–satem division is not seen as a real familial division.

Vowels

Note that, although both Tocharian A and Tocharian B have the same set of vowels, they often do not correspond to each other. For instance, the sound a did not occur in Proto-Tocharian.

Consonants

The following table lists the reconstructed phonemes in Proto-Tocharian along with their standard transcription. Because its descendants are written in an alphabet used originally for Sanskrit and its descendants, the transcription of the sounds is directly based on the transcription of the corresponding Sanskrit sounds. The Tocharian alphabet also has letters representing all of the remaining Sanskrit sounds, but these appear only in Sanskrit loanwords and are not thought to have had distinct pronunciations in Tocharian.  There is some uncertainty as to actual pronunciation of some of the letters, particularly those representing palatalized obstruents (see below).

  is transcribed by two different letters in the Tocharian alphabet depending on position.  Based on the corresponding letters in Sanskrit, these are transcribed  (word-finally, including before certain clitics) and n (elsewhere), but  represents , not .
 The sound written  is thought to correspond to a palatal stop  in Sanskrit.  The Tocharian pronunciation  is suggested by the common occurrence of the cluster śc, but the exact pronunciation cannot be determined with certainty.
 The sound written  corresponds to retroflex sibilant  in Sanskrit, but it seems more likely to have been a palato-alveolar sibilant  (as in English "ship"), because it derives from a palatalized .
 The sound ṅ  occurs only before k, or in some clusters where a k has been deleted between consonants. It is clearly phonemic because sequences nk and ñk also exist (from syncope of a former ä between them).

Morphology

Nouns
Proto-Tocharian has completely re-worked the nominal declension system of Proto-Indo-European. The only cases inherited from the proto-language are nominative, genitive, accusative, and vocative (preserved in descendants, but Tocharian A lost the vocative case); in Proto-Tocharian the old accusative is known as the oblique case. In addition to these primary cases, however, each Tocharian language has six cases formed by the addition of an invariant suffix to the oblique case – although the set of six cases is not the same in each language, and the suffixes are largely non-cognate. For instance, the Tocharian B word yakwe, the Tocharian A word yuk < Proto-Tocharian *yä́kwë < PIE *h₁éḱwos, all meaning "horse", are declined as follows:

When referring to humans, the oblique singular of most adjectives and of some nouns is marked in both varieties by an ending -(a)ṃ, which also appears in the secondary cases. This is thought to stem from the generalization of n-stem adjectives as an indication of determinative semantics, seen most prominently in the weak adjective declension in the Germanic languages (where it cooccurs with definite articles and determiners), but also in Latin and Greek n-stem nouns (especially proper names) formed from adjectives, e.g. Latin Catō (genitive Catōnis) literally "the sly one"  < catus "sly", Greek Plátōn literally "the broad-shouldered one" < platús "broad".

Verbs
In contrast, the verb verbal conjugation system is quite conservative. The majority of Proto-Indo-European verbal classes and categories are represented in some manner in Tocharian, although not necessarily with the same function. Some examples: athematic and thematic present tenses, including null-, -y-, -sḱ-, -s-, -n- and -nH- suffixes as well as n-infixes and various laryngeal-ending stems; o-grade and possibly lengthened-grade perfects (although lacking reduplication or augment); sigmatic, reduplicated, thematic and possibly lengthened-grade aorists; optatives; imperatives; and possibly PIE subjunctives.

In addition, most PIE sets of endings are found in some form in Proto-Tocharian (although with significant innovations), including thematic and athematic endings, primary (non-past) and secondary (past) endings, active and mediopassive endings, and perfect endings. Dual endings are still found, although they are rarely attested and generally restricted to the third person. The mediopassive still reflects the distinction between primary -r and secondary -i, effaced in most Indo-European languages.  Both root and suffix ablaut is still well-represented, although again with significant innovations.

Categories
Proto-Tocharian verbs are conjugated in the following categories:
Mood: indicative, subjunctive, optative, imperative.
Tense/aspect (in the indicative only): present, preterite, imperfect.
Voice: active, mediopassive, deponent.
Person: 1st, 2nd, 3rd.
Number: singular, dual, plural.
Causation: basic, causative.
Non-finite: active participle, mediopassive participle, present gerundive, subjunctive gerundive.

Classes
A given verb belongs to one of a large number of classes, according to its conjugation.  As in Sanskrit, Ancient Greek and (to a lesser extent) Latin, there are independent sets of classes in the indicative present, subjunctive, perfect, imperative, and to a limited extent optative and imperfect, and there is no general correspondence among the different sets of classes, meaning that each verb must be specified using a number of principal parts.

Present indicative
The most complex system is the present indicative, consisting of 12 classes, 8 thematic and 4 athematic, with distinct sets of thematic and athematic endings.  The following classes occur in Tocharian B (some are missing in Tocharian A):
I: Athematic without suffix < PIE root athematic.
II: Thematic without suffix < PIE root thematic.
III: Thematic with PToch suffix *-ë-. Mediopassive only.  Apparently reflecting consistent PIE o theme rather than the normal alternating o/e theme.
IV: Thematic with PToch suffix *-ɔ-. Mediopassive only.  Same PIE origin as class III.
V: Athematic with PToch suffix *-ā-, likely from either PIE verbs ending in a syllabic laryngeal or PIE derived verbs in *-eh₂- (but extended to other verbs).
VI: Athematic with PToch suffix *-nā-, from PIE verbs in *-nH-.
VII: Athematic with infixed nasal, from PIE infixed nasal verbs.
VIII: Thematic with suffix -s-, possibly from PIE -sḱ-.
IX: Thematic with suffix -sk- < PIE -sḱ-.
X: Thematic with PToch suffix *-näsk/nāsk-, combination of classes VI and IX.
XI: Thematic in PToch suffix *-säsk-, combination of classes VIII and IX.
XII: Thematic with PToch suffix *-(ä)ññ- < either PIE *-n-y- (denominative to n-stem nouns) or PIE *-nH-y- (deverbative from PIE *-nH- verbs).

Palatalization of the final root consonant occurs in the 2nd singular, 3rd singular, 3rd dual and 2nd plural in thematic classes II and VIII-XII as a result of the original PIE thematic vowel e.

Subjunctive
The subjunctive likewise has 12 classes, denoted i through xii.  Most are conjugated identically to the corresponding indicative classes; indicative and subjunctive are distinguished by the fact that a verb in a given indicative class will usually belong to a different subjunctive class.

In addition, four subjunctive classes differ from the corresponding indicative classes, two "special subjunctive" classes with differing suffixes and two "varying subjunctive" classes with root ablaut reflecting the PIE perfect.

Special subjunctives:
iv: Thematic with suffix i < PIE -y-, with consistent palatalization of final root consonant. Found in Tocharian B only, rare.
vii: Thematic (not athematic, as in indicative class VII) with suffix ñ < PIE -n- (palatalized by thematic e, with palatalized variant generalized).

Varying subjunctives:
i: Athematic without suffix, with root ablaut reflecting PIE o-grade in active singular, zero-grade elsewhere.  Derived from PIE perfect.
v: Identical to class i but with PToch suffix *-ā-, originally reflecting laryngeal-final roots but generalized.

Preterite
The preterite has 6 classes:
I: The most common class, with a suffix ā < PIE Ḥ (i.e. roots ending in a laryngeal, although widely extended to other roots).  This class shows root ablaut, with original e-grade (and palatalization of the initial root consonant) in the active singular, contrasting with zero-grade (and no palatalization) elsewhere.
II: This class has reduplication in Tocharian A (possibly reflecting the PIE reduplicated aorist).  However, Tocharian B has a vowel reflecting long PIE ē, along with palatalization of the initial root consonant.  There is no ablaut in this class.
III: This class has a suffix s in the 3rd singular active and throughout the mediopassive, evidently reflecting the PIE sigmatic aorist. Root ablaut occurs between active and mediopassive. A few verbs have palatalization in the active along with s in the 3rd singular, but no palatalization and no s in the mediopassive, along with no root ablaut (the vowel reflects PToch ë). This suggests that, for these verbs in particular, the active originates in the PIE sigmatic aorist (with s suffix and ē vocalism) while the mediopassive stems from the PIE perfect (with o vocalism).
IV: This class has suffix ṣṣā, with no ablaut. Most verbs in this class are causatives.
V: This class has suffix ñ(ñ)ā, with no ablaut. Only a few verbs belong to this class.
VI: This class, which has only two verbs, is derived from the PIE thematic aorist. As in Greek, this class has different endings from all the others, which partly reflect the PIE secondary endings (as expected for the thematic aorist).

All except preterite class VI have a common set of endings that stem from the PIE perfect endings, although with significant innovations.

Imperative
The imperative likewise shows 6 classes, with a unique set of endings, found only in the second person, and a Proto-Tocharian prefix *pä- but unexpected connecting vowels occasionally occur, and the prefix combines with vowel-initial and glide-initial roots in unexpected ways. The prefix is often compared with the Slavic perfective prefix po-, although the phonology is difficult to explain.

Classes i through v tend to co-occur with preterite classes I through V, although there are many exceptions.  Class vi is not so much a coherent class as an "irregular" class with all verbs not fitting in other categories.  The imperative classes tend to share the same suffix as the corresponding preterite (if any), but to have root vocalism that matches the vocalism of a verb's subjunctive.  This includes the root ablaut of subjunctive classes i and v, which tend to co-occur with imperative class i.

Optative and imperfect
The optative and imperfect have related formations. The optative is generally built by adding i onto the subjunctive stem. Tocharian B likewise forms the imperfect by adding i onto the present indicative stem, while Tocharian A has 4 separate imperfect formations: usually ā is added to the subjunctive stem, but occasionally to the indicative stem, and sometimes either ā or s is added directly onto the root.  The endings differ between the two languages: Tocharian A uses present endings for the optative and preterite endings for the imperfect, while Tocharian B uses the same endings for both, which are a combination of preterite and unique endings (the latter used in the singular active).

Endings
As suggested by the above discussion, there are a large number of sets of endings.  The present-tense endings come in both thematic and athematic variants, although they are related, with the thematic endings generally reflecting a theme vowel (PIE e or o) plus the athematic endings.  There are different sets for the preterite classes I through V; preterite class VI; the imperative; and in Tocharian B, in the singular active of the optative and imperfect.  Furthermore, each set of endings comes with both active and mediopassive forms.  The mediopassive forms are quite conservative, directly reflecting the PIE variation between -r in the present and -i in the past. (Most other languages with the mediopassive have generalized one of the two.)

The present-tense endings are almost completely divergent between Tocharian A and B.  The following shows the thematic endings, with their origin:

References

Tocharian languages
Tocharian
Indo-European languages